Kerri Irvin-Ross is a Canadian former politician in Manitoba. A member of the New Democratic Party, she served as a cabinet minister under premiers Gary Doer and Greg Selinger, including as Selinger's deputy premier from 2015 to 2016.

Irvin-Ross defeated Progressive Conservative incumbent Joy Smith by 87 votes in the riding of Fort Garry in the 2003 general election. She defeated Progressive Conservative Shaun McCaffrey in Fort Garry by 4,291 to 2,101 in the 2007 general election. In the 2011 general election, Irvin-Ross chose to run in the newly created constituency of Fort Richmond and was re-elected over McCaffrey by 4,026 votes to 2,908. Irvin-Ross was defeated in the 2016 election, losing her seat to PC candidate Sarah Guillemard.

In 2006, Irvin-Ross joined Doer's cabinet as Minister of Healthy Living, holding the post until Doer's retirement in 2009. In 2009, newly sworn in premier Selinger named her to the new portfolio of Minister of Housing and Community Development. In 2013, she became Minister of Family Services and  Minister responsible for Status of Women, which she held until 2016; she also briefly regained Housing and Community development from 2014 to 2015. In 2016, she was named Minister responsible for Persons with Disabilities and Minister responsible for the Civil Service, and in 2016 she became Deputy Premier of Manitoba. She held all three roles until the government's defeat in the 2016 election.

References

External links
 
 Government of Manitoba

New Democratic Party of Manitoba MLAs
Women MLAs in Manitoba
Living people
Members of the Executive Council of Manitoba
Politicians from Winnipeg
Women government ministers of Canada
21st-century Canadian women politicians
Year of birth missing (living people)